Jawor is a town and county seat in Lower Silesian Voivodeship, south-west Poland.

Jawor may also refer to the following places:

Jawor, Góra County in Lower Silesian Voivodeship (south-west Poland)
Jawor, Milicz County in Lower Silesian Voivodeship (south-west Poland)
Jawor, Bełchatów County in Łódź Voivodeship (central Poland)
Jawor, Opoczno County in Łódź Voivodeship (central Poland)
Jawor, Gmina Solina in Subcarpathian Voivodeship (south-east Poland)
Jawor (mountain) a mountain in Subcarpathian Voivodeship (south-east Poland)

See also
Jauer (disambiguation)
Javor (disambiguation)